The 1967 Irish local elections were held in all the counties, cities and towns of Ireland on Wednesday, 28 June 1967. The result was a large gain in seats for Fine Gael, while Fianna Fáil and Labour remained largely unchanged on net seat totals. Others, including independents and Sinn Féin, lost many seats.

The context of the elections was an Ireland in the process of rapid modernisation. Social changes since the 1960 local elections include the launch of the first national television network, Telefís Éireann, in 1961. The National Farmers Association campaigned against the Fianna Fáil government, which was reducing tariffs in preparation for European Economic Community membership. Several NFA representatives won seats, particularly in Tipperary and Offaly. Labour's breakthrough in Dublin, coupled with a decline in rural areas, marked another step in its transformation from a rural party to an urban one.

Results

See also 
Local government in the Republic of Ireland
:Category:Irish local government councils

References 

Local elections
1967 elections in Europe
1967 in Irish politics
1967
June 1967 events in Europe
Local elections